Mindouli (can also be written as Minduli) is one of two towns in the Republic of Congo with this name.  This is the one in the Pool Department.  It is very close to the border with the Democratic Republic of the Congo.

Transport 

Mindoulu is served by a station on the main line of the Congo-Ocean Railway.

See also 

 Railway stations in Congo

References 

Pool Department
Populated places in the Republic of the Congo